Andrew John Thackeray (born 13 February 1968 in Huddersfield) is an English former professional footballer who made more than 400 appearances in the Football League playing as a defender.

Thackeray was part of the Manchester City youth team which won the FA Youth Cup in 1986, but moved on to Huddersfield Town without appearing for City's first team. He played only twice for Huddersfield, then spent a season with Newport County, before making more than 150 league appearances for each of his next two employers, Wrexham and Rochdale. In the 1997–98 season he helped Halifax Town to promotion from the Conference and played one more season in the Football League. Thackeray then returned to the Conference, spending four seasons with Nuneaton Borough. In 2003, he joined Ashton United, where he scored 5 goals from 91 games in all competitions, and for a time acted as assistant manager. His final club before retirement was Mossley, where he scored 4 goals from 74 games, and won the Player of the Year award in helping them to the Northern Premier League Division One title in the 2005–06 season.

References

External links
 

1968 births
Living people
Footballers from Huddersfield
English footballers
English Football League players
Association football defenders
Manchester City F.C. players
Huddersfield Town A.F.C. players
Newport County A.F.C. players
Wrexham A.F.C. players
Rochdale A.F.C. players
Halifax Town A.F.C. players
Nuneaton Borough F.C. players
Ashton United F.C. players
Mossley A.F.C. players